Sirarakhong also called as Kampha is a village located west of Ukhrul in Ukhrul district, Manipur state, India. As per 2011 census, the village has a total of 202 households with 1243 persons of which 620 are male while 623 are female. Of the total population, 10.86% are in the age group of 0–6 years. The average sex ratio of the village is 1015 female per 1000 male which is higher than the state's average of 930. The literacy rate of the village is 95.22%.

Religion
Sirarakhong is one of the Tangkhul villages that embraced Christianity very early. For this, the villagers got access to western education right from the coming of Christian missionaries to Ukhrul district. Hundred percent of the inhabitants are Christians. As per 2011 census, the literacy rate of the village was 95.22% which is higher than the state's average of 76.94%.

People and occupations
The village is home to people of Tangkhul Naga tribe. Agriculture is the primary occupation of the inhabitants. Sirarakhong is well known in the district for the mass production of indigenous chilli, locally called 'Hathei'. The village hosts Sirarakhong Hathei (Chilli) Festival  annually to attract both domestic and international tourists.

References

Villages in Ukhrul district